KAHC-LD (channel 43) is a low-power  television station in Sacramento, California, United States, airing paid programming via the OnTV4U network and is affiliated with Cozi TV on its third digital subchannel. The station is owned by HC2 Holdings. Operator DTV America Corporation, which also operates Stockton-licensed KFKK-LD, retains the station license.

History
KAHC-LD began operations in 1988 as K69FB, on analog channel 69, and was originally affiliated with the Trinity Broadcasting Network (TBN). On June 17, 2004, its call letters changed to K45HC and switched to analog channel 45. In 2015, K45HC disaffiliated with TBN after 27 years and the station went silent for about a year.

In 2016, it went on the air again with new call letters as KAHC-LP, later becoming its current call letters of KAHC-LD, after the station switched from analog to digital, remaining on its analog-era channel number 45. However, its virtual channel number was switched to channel 43 as sister station KFTY-LD in Middletown, California has its virtual channel number as 45 and its broadcasting radius overlapped that of KAHC. Secondly, KAHC wasn’t assigned KFTY's digital channel number of 2 as its virtual channel number due to a broadcasting radius overlap of Fox owned-and-operated station KTVU in Oakland, operating on virtual channel 2. When KAHC returned to the air in 2016, it was briefly affiliated with Laff, before switching affiliations to American Sports Network, which later became Stadium. When KMAX-TV, channel 31, affiliated with Stadium on subchannel 31.4 in 2018, KAHC retained the Stadium affiliation for a time as both stations became dual affiliates. However, in 2019, KAHC disaffiliated from Stadium and switched to infomercials. In early 2020, KAHC became a CBN News affiliate, returning religious programming to the channel since its disaffiliation with TBN. The affiliation was dropped later that year, reverting to infomercials. In early 2021, KAHC affiliated with shopping network ShopHQ until April 2022 when the affiliation was dropped and the channel reverted to infomercials again via the OnTV4U network.

Technical information

Subchannels
The station's digital channel is multiplexed:

When KAHC-LD switched to digital in 2016, initial subchannel affiliates included Comet on LD2, Cozi TV on LD3, Shop LC on LD4, QVC on LD5 and QVC Plus (later QVC2) on LD6. Comet was dropped in 2018 as it moved to KMAX-TV (channel 31.3).

KAHC affiliated with Tuff TV on LD7 in 2017 up until 2018, shortly before the network ceased operations.

Despite of NBCUniversal's purchase of local Telemundo affiliate KCSO-LD (channel 33) in 2019, Cozi TV, which is owned by NBCUniversal and usually affiliated with other NBC or Telemundo-owned stations on their digital subchannels, remained on KAHC.

References

External links

DTV America

Cozi TV affiliates
AHO
Low-power television stations in the United States
Innovate Corp.
Television channels and stations established in 1988